Great Bridgeford is a village in Staffordshire, England. Population details taken at the 2011 census can be found under Seighford. It lies on the A5013 and is the point where the B5405 meets the A5013.

The village lies on the West Coast Main Line (London to Glasgow) railway and contains a village hall, and two tennis courts.

The village was served by two successive railway stations, the first from 1837 to 1840 and the second from 1876 until closing in 1959.
The railway line at Great Bridgeford was the scene of a major accident and derailment on the evening of 6 June 1932. Four people died and many others were injured in this accident. A picture of the rail locomotive lying on its side in the aftermath of the accident can be seen here:

See also
Listed buildings in Seighford

References

External links

Villages in Staffordshire
Borough of Stafford